= Dighalgram =

Dighalgram is a village located in Mohammad Bazar Block of Birbhum district, West Bengal with total 1360 families residing. The Dighalgram village has population of 6284 of which 3194 are males while 3090 are females as per Population Census 2011.

In Dighalgram village population of children with age 0-6 is 949 which makes up 15.10% of total population of village. Average Sex Ratio of Dighalgram village is 967 which is higher than West Bengal state average of 950. Child Sex Ratio for the Dighalgram as per census is 981, higher than West Bengal average of 956.

Dighalgram village has lower literacy rate compared to West Bengal. In 2011, literacy rate of Dighalgram village was 64.52% compared to 76.26% of West Bengal. In Dighalgram Male literacy stands at 68.66% while female literacy rate was 60.23%.

As per constitution of India and Panchyati Raaj Act, Dighalgram village is administrated by Sarpanch (Head of Village) who is elected representative of village.

Caste Factor :

Schedule Caste (SC) constitutes 7.11% while Schedule Tribe (ST) were 3.93% of total population in Dighalgram village.

Work Profile :

In Dighalgram village out of total population, 1675 were engaged in work activities. 60.78% of workers describe their work as Main Work (Employment or Earning more than 6 Months) while 39.22% were involved in Marginal activity providing livelihood for less than 6 months. Of 1675 workers engaged in Main Work, 112 were cultivators (owner or co-owner) while 339 were Agricultural labourer.
